Francisco Reynés Massanet (Mallorca, Spain, 1963), is a Spanish businessman and the current Executive Chairman of Naturgy (formerly Gas Natural Fenosa). Prior to this, he was CEO of Abertis Group, a role he held from 2010.

Reynés studied industrial engineering at the University of Barcelona, specializing in mechanical engineering, and an MBA at IESE Business School.

Francisco Reynés has held executive positions in Gas Natural Fenosa, Segur Caixa Holding, Boursorama and Adeslas, among others. He was named in July 2007 General Manager of Criteria CaixaCorp, La Caixa business holding. From this position he carried out the process for the company to go public in October 2007. In 2010, he was appointed CEO of Abertis Group and Vicechairman in 2015. He represented Abertis Infrastructuras on the Governing Boards of Sanef in Paris, Arteris in São Paulo and Hispasat in Madrid. Under his direction, Abertis has become the largest toll road business in the world with more than 7,500km under management. He was also chairman of Cellnex Telecom.

Awards 

In December 2021, he received the 'CEO of the Year' award at the Platts Global Energy Awards.

References 

20th-century Spanish businesspeople
21st-century Spanish businesspeople

1963 births
Living people